Germinal Esgleas Jaume was the pseudonym of Josep Esgleas i Jaume (Malgrat de Mar, 1903 - Tolosa, 1981) was a Catalan anarcho-syndicalist and militant of the FAI.

Exile

Exiled in France after the Spanish Civil War, he collaborated in the formation of the Spanish Libertarian Movement (MLE). In May 1945, he became General Secretary of the CNT during his exile in Paris after facing off with the previous General Secretary, Juan Manuel Molina Mateo. In those years a split took place between the orthodox faction and the possibilist faction, the latter of which was in favor of collaboration with the Spanish Republican government in exile. Esgleas was general secretary of the Orthodox faction until 1947, and again he was general secretary between 1952 and 1957. From 1958 to 1963 he was secretary general of the AIT. Later, when the two factions of the CNT reunited, he was general secretary between 1963 and 1967 and between 1969 and 1973. His appointment was answered by Cipriano Mera in 1964, who accused him, among other things, of appropriation of the running of the organization. His opinion was dominant within the CNT during the 1960s, which is why many of his detractors have accused him of immobility.

Works 
 Decíamos ayer. Verdades de todas horas
 Sindicalismo: orientación doctrinal y táctica de los sindicatos obreros y la CNT (1935)

References

External links 
 Germinal Esgleas i Jaume L'Enciclopèdia.cat. Barcelona: Grup Enciclopèdia Catalana.
 Murió el líder anarquista "Germinal" Esgleas a El País, 22 d'octubre de 1981
 La CNT durante el franquismo per Ángel Herrín López

1903 births
1981 deaths
Secretaries General of the Confederación Nacional del Trabajo
Politicians from Catalonia
Anarchists from Catalonia
People from Maresme
Anarcho-syndicalists
Spanish emigrants to France